Kjartan Gunnarsson (born October 4, 1951) is an Icelandic lawyer, best known for serving for 26 years as the executive director of the Icelandic conservative Independence Party from 1980 until 2006.  He has also worked for Landsbanki bank.   He is a longtime supporter and friend of former Icelandic Prime Minister Davíð Oddsson.

References

Kjartan Gunnarsson
Living people
1951 births
Kjartan Gunnarsson
21st-century Icelandic lawyers